Sekachi is a rural locality (a khutor) in Mikhaylovka Urban Okrug, Volgograd Oblast, Russia. The population was 653 as of 2010. There are 17 streets.

Geography 
Sekachi is located 67 km northeast of Mikhaylovka. 2-y Plotnikov is the nearest rural locality.

References 

Rural localities in Mikhaylovka urban okrug